The Weiser River is a  tributary of the Snake River in western Idaho in the United States. It drains a mountainous area of  consisting primarily of low rolling foothills intersected by small streams south and east of Hells Canyon along the Idaho-Oregon border.

Description
It flows generally southwest, between the Cuddy Mountains to the west and the West Mountains to the east, past Council and Cambridge. In southern Washington County it turns west for its lower  and enters a broadening valley called the Weiser Cove along the northwestern extreme of the Snake River Plain before entering the Snake from the east at Weiser.

For much of its upper reaches, the river follows a narrow course through the mountains, emerging at times into several broad ranching valleys, including one around Midvale. Although it flows unimpeded, it is used for irrigation in the vicinity of its mouth upstream from Weiser, as well along tributaries in its upper reaches. The Pacific and Idaho Northern Railroad formerly followed its course from Weiser to New Meadows.

The river, as well as the town of Weiser, are named for Private Peter M. Weiser of the Lewis and Clark Expedition of 1804-1806.

See also

 List of Idaho rivers
 List of longest streams of Idaho

References

External links

 Idaho State University: Weiser River Drainage

Rivers of Idaho
Tributaries of the Snake River
Rivers of Adams County, Idaho
Rivers of Washington County, Idaho
Payette National Forest
Rivers of Valley County, Idaho